bsg episodes may refer to:

 List of Battlestar Galactica (2004 TV series) episodes
 List of Battlestar Galactica (1978 TV series) and Galactica 1980 episodes
 List of Bering Sea Gold episodes

See also
 BSG (disambiguation)